As in many neighboring countries, most environmental issues in Ethiopia relate to deforestation and endangered species.

Geological issues
The Main Ethiopian Rift is geologically active and susceptible to earthquakes. Hot springs and active volcanoes are found in its extreme east close to the Red Sea. Elsewhere, the land is subject to erosion, overgrazing, deforestation, and frequent droughts. Water shortages are common in some areas during the dry season. The causes of degradation are primarily the demand for more land for agriculture, fuel and construction as well as for grazing grounds.

Endangered animals

Ethiopian wolf
The Ethiopian wolf is one of the rarest and most endangered of all canid species. The numerous names given to this species reflect previous uncertainties about its taxonomic position. However, the Ethiopian wolf is  now thought to be related to the wolves of the genus Canis, rather that sold for about US$175 each to taxidermists who then retail the stuffed lions for US$400. "For the time being our immediate solution is to send them to the taxidermists, but the final and best solution is to extend the zoo into a wider area," Muhedin said.

The director of the wildlife division of Ethiopia's Ministry of Agriculture said he had no idea the lions were being culled.

Deforestation 

Ethiopia had a 2018 Forest Landscape Integrity Index mean score of 7.16/10, ranking it 50th globally out of 172 countries.

References 

 Haileselassie, A. (2004) “Ethiopia’s struggle over land reform,” World Press Review 51.4, 32(2). Expanded Academic ASAP.
 Hillstrom, K. & Hillstrom, C. (2003). Africa and the Middle east; a continental Overview of Environmental Issues. Santa Barbara: ABC-CLIO.
 Maddox, G.H. (2006). Sub-Saharan Africa: An environmental history. Santa Barbara, CA: ABC-CLIO.
 McCann.J.C.(1990). "A Great Agrarian cycle? Productivity in Highland Ethiopia, 1900–1987," Journal of Interdisciplinary History, 20:3, pp. 389–416. (Retrieved November 18, 2006 from JSTOR database)
 McCann, J.C. (1999). Green land, Brown land, Black land: An environmental history of Africa 1800–1990. Portsmouth, NH: Heinemann.
 Mongabay.com "Ethiopia statistics." (Retrieved November 18, 2006)
 Parry, J (2003). "Tree choppers become tree planters," Appropriate Technology, 30(4), 38–39. Retrieved November 22, 2006, from ABI/INFORM Global database. (Document ID: 538367341)
 Parry, K (2003) "Perceptions of forest cover and tree planting and ownership in Jimma Zone, Ethiopia” unasylva, vol 54 Iss: 213 (2003), pp. 18(2).
 Sucoff, E. (2003). "Deforestation", Environmental Encyclopedia, at pp. 358–359. Detroit: Gale.
 Williams, M. (2006). Deforesting the earth: From prehistory to global crisis: An Abridgment. Chicago: University Press.

External links
WildCRU – Conservation of Ethiopian wolves (Canis simensis) University of Oxford Department of Zoology website
 Eco-Tourism and Wildlife in Oromo territory

Issues
Ethiopia